There are 134 places of worship in use across the district of Wealden, the largest of six local government districts in the English county of East Sussex.  The mostly rural district, with five small towns and dozens of villages, has a 1,200-year documented history of Christian worship—a Saxon leader founded a church at Rotherfield in 790—and by the 19th century nearly every settlement had at least one church, as formerly extensive parishes were split up.  Protestant Nonconformism, always strong in Sussex, flourished in the area now covered by the district: many Baptist, Methodist and Congregational chapels were built, and most survive.  New churches continued to be built throughout the 20th century as the population grew.  The district also has 50 former places of worship: their buildings survive but are now used for other purposes.

Historic England or its predecessor English Heritage have awarded listed status to more than 60 current and former church buildings in Wealden.  A building is defined as "listed" when it is placed on a statutory register of buildings of "special architectural or historic interest" in accordance with the Planning (Listed Buildings and Conservation Areas) Act 1990.  The Department for Digital, Culture, Media and Sport, a Government department, is responsible for this; English Heritage, a non-departmental public body, acts as an agency of the department to administer the process and advise the department on relevant issues.  There are three grades of listing status. Grade I, the highest, is defined as being of "exceptional interest"; Grade II* is used for "particularly important buildings of more than special interest"; and Grade II, the lowest, is used for buildings of "special interest".  As of February 2001, there were 47 Grade I-listed buildings, 106 with Grade II* status and 2,020 Grade II-listed buildings in Wealden.

Location of Wealden and its places of worship

Wealden is at the centre of these: the district of Lewes lies to the west and Rother is to the east. The borough of Eastbourne, to the south, is completely surrounded by the district. Wealden stretches the entire length of the county from the English Channel coast to the county boundaries of West Sussex, Surrey and Kent: it has also has boundaries with the local authority areas of Mid Sussex, Tandridge, Sevenoaks and Tunbridge Wells.

Wealden's population at the time of the United Kingdom Census 2011 was 148,915.  Five small towns—Crowborough, Hailsham, Heathfield, Polegate and Uckfield—account for about half of these people, and each has several places of worship catering for different denominations.  The rest of the population is spread across dozens of villages and hamlets in the largely rural district.  Many of these settlements have at least one church—often an ancient building on a site where worship has taken place for over a thousand years.  St Wilfrid, exiled to Sussex in the late 7th century, and his near-contemporary St Cuthman rapidly Christianised the county, and the 111 churches described in the Domesday Book of 1086 was a significant underestimate.

The oldest surviving church features in the district are from the Saxon era, found in a string of churches on the edges of the South Downs or in the flat plains around the River Cuckmere: at Arlington, East Dean, Friston and Jevington.  Norman work survives in the churches at Alciston, Berwick, Hellingly, Herstmonceux, Isfield, Litlington, Little Horsted, Rotherfield (whose original church was founded in 792), Westdean, Westham and Wilmington.  A rare Norman-era piscina survives at East Hoathly in an otherwise largely Victorian church, and at Hartfield a mostly late medieval church retains Norman masonry in one wall.  Several Norman features survive at Maresfield but were moved around during Victorian restoration.  Wadhurst's church was added to throughout the medieval era, but its Norman tower survives; and part of the Norman chancel survives at Pevensey in an otherwise mostly 13th-century church.  Churches largely or wholly of that century—some of which replaced earlier buildings—can be found at Buxted, Chalvington, Chiddingly, Fletching (although Pevnser describes its tower as Norman), Folkington, Framfield (rebuilt in the 16th century after a fire), Lullington and Waldron.  Features from the 13th century also survive at Hooe, Laughton, Ripe, Warbleton, Wartling and Willingdon, which were rebuilt or extended later in the medieval era, and at Ninfield in a church subjected to extensive 19th-century rebuilding.  At Alfriston, the original Anglo-Saxon church was replaced in the 1360s by the vast cruciform "Cathedral of the Downs", whose flintwork is "some of the best in England".  Also from that century is the church at Old Heathfield.  Mayfield's ancient church (founded by Dunstan, the saint to which it is dedicated) is mostly 15th-century.  English Anglican churches wholly of the 17th and 18th centuries are rare, but Withyham (rebuilt in 1680 after the predecessor burnt down) and Crowborough (newly built in 1744 and altered later) are represented in the district.

The 19th century was characterised by "an unprecedented upsurge" in the provision of new Anglican churches and the expansion of existing buildings, prompted by an increase in the competing attractions of Nonconformist denominations, a "quickening of religious feeling" in general and the huge increase in the population of towns.  In some cases vast rural parishes were subdivided; in others, chapels of ease were provided in outlying rural areas distant from their parish church.  Victorian restoration of old churches took place across the district and was particularly extensive at Hailsham, Selmeston and Uckfield, where the buildings are now essentially 19th-century.  The era of large-scale churchbuilding (as opposed to restoration) in Wealden began in the late Georgian era with the opening of a new church in Frant, built between 1819 and 1822.  The year 1836, just before Victoria's reign started, was significant: William Moseley was responsible for new churches in Forest Row and Hadlow Down that year (although the latter was greatly reworked in 1913); and Danehill, a main-road village in Fletching parish, also received its first chapel of ease in 1836.  The present church of 1892 is by Bodley and Garner.  It is the Victorian era that is most associated with the increase in churchbuilding activity, though.  A church in the outlying part of Withyham parish close to the growing town of Crowborough opened in 1839.  Four years later, a church was completed at Upper Dicker in Arlington parish; and prolific architect Richard Cromwell Carpenter's church at Nutley dates from 1845.  The churches at Eridge and Tidebrook date from 1852 and 1856 respectively.  James Piers St Aubyn designed a chapel of ease at Cross-in-Hand, the main settlement in Waldron parish, in 1863–64.  A former school was converted into a chapel of ease in Mark Cross, part of Rotherfield parish, in 1873, although it was soon granted its own parish.  A year later, work began on a church for the rapidly growing village of Polegate, and a church was built to serve the village of Horam in 1890.  Endowments by rich benefactors allowed churches to be built at High Hurstwood (1872) and Hammerwood (1880).  The wealthy Vicar of Brighton Arthur Wagner, who had a house in Buxted and established a convent there, also paid for the construction of a second church for the village in 1885–86.  Fairwarp's church, designed in 1881 by Major Rohde Hawkins, was substantially extended in the 20th century, funded by the Eckstein baronets.  Churches continued to be built throughout the 20th century.  Examples include Blackham (1902), Jarvis Brook (1906), Colemans Hatch (1913, by Arthur Blomfield), Heathfield town (1915), Bodle Street Green (1923, replacing a fire-damaged one), Stone Cross (1924; a chapel of ease in Westham parish), Alderbrook (1957), Broad Oak (1959), Lower Willingdon (1962) and Pevensey Bay (1968, replacing one of 1881).  In the east of Uckfield a tin tabernacle erected in 1904 was replaced by a combined church and sheltered housing development in 1971.

Much of the southern and central part of present-day Wealden was covered by the vast Roman Catholic parish of the Our Lady of Ransom Church, Eastbourne.  The strength of Protestant Nonconformism in the East Sussex countryside led to anti-Catholic feeling locally, and it was difficult to find suitable premises outside Eastbourne to celebrate Mass for the small number of Catholics in the area.  Eastbourne's parish priest founded a Mass centre in Hailsham in 1917, and numbers of worshippers grew to the extent that the rented premises (the hay-loft of a brewery's stables) were swapped for a purpose-built church in 1922.  The present St Wilfrid's Church dates from 2015.  A church was also built in Polegate in 1938;  St George's Church is now part of a joint parish with St Wilfrid's.  The area around Uckfield has supported two Catholic churches since the late 19th century, in the town itself and at Heron's Ghyll; they are also joined as one parish.  St John the Evangelist Church at Heron's Ghyll dates from 1896–97, but a Catholic mission was founded there 30 years earlier by poet Coventry Patmore.  Frederick Walters, its architect, also designed Uckfield's first Catholic church; it was replaced by the present distinctive concrete-framed Church of Our Lady Immaculate and St Philip Neri, completed in 1958.  Crowborough's church opened in 1911 and was enlarged in 1922.  In Mayfield, an oratory dedicated to St Thomas of Canterbury in the convent school at the Old Palace was used for public Masses from 1932, although it was not formally registered for worship until 1946 and for marriages the following year.  A permanent church of the same dedication was completed in 1957 to the design of prolific local architect Henry Bingham Towner.  Catholic worship in the Wadhurst area was focused on the chapel at The Mount Novitiate House of Fathers of Charity, originally founded by Rosminians, but they built the present Church of the Sacred Heart in 1929 for use by the general public.  St Catherine's Church was built in 1953 to serve Heathfield, but it has been demolished and local Catholics now worship at the chapel of a Benedictine convent in nearby Cross-in-Hand.  Churches were also opened in Forest Row in 1958 (closed 2009) and both Pevensey Bay and Rotherfield in 1963 (closed 2016 and 2019 respectively).

The Methodist Statistical Returns published in 1947 recorded the existence of 17 Methodist chapels, all of Wesleyan origin, in present-day Wealden.  Chapels at Blacknest, Gamelands and Hailsham were part of the Eastbourne Circuit; the St Leonards and Bexhill Circuit looked after chapels at Lower Ninfield (Russell's Green) and Upper Ninfield; chapels at Boarshead, Crowborough, Groombridge, Hartfield and Rotherfield were in the Tunbridge Wells Circuit; and the Sussex Mission was responsible for the chapels at Blackboys, Buxted, Cross-in-Hand, East Hoathly, Laughton, Ridgewood, East Sussex and Uckfield.  Those at Buxted, Cross-in-Hand, Gamelands, Hailsham and Upper Ninfield are still used for Methodist worship, and Methodist congregations still worship in Crowborough and Uckfield but share the United Reformed Church buildings in both towns.  Another joint United Reformed and Methodist church exists in Lower Willingdon: originally built for Wesleyan Methodists, it was closed at the time of the Statistical Returns survey.  Only one separate United Reformed church exists in the district, at Polegate (opened in 1904 as a Congregational chapel).  A Congregational chapel built in 1811 in Herstmonceux declined to join the United Reformed Church when that denomination was formed in 1972 (incorporating most English Congregational chapels) and instead is part of the independent Congregational Federation; and the present Hailsham Free Church (now Evangelical) was originally registered for Congregationalists.

Churches with a Calvinistic character, whether independent or aligned with the doctrines of the Strict and Particular Baptists, have thrived since the 18th century.  (The term "Strict Baptist" to describe a distinctively Calvinist interpretation of Baptist view developed in the 19th century "with the purpose of organising a range of Calvinistic Baptist causes within a denominational identity".)  Sussex, and the east of the county in particular, is "particularly well endowed with wayside chapels" supporting these principles: such buildings are typically "modest in scale, neat ... [and] restrained", with a "quiet and unassuming elegance".  The 800-capacity Zoar Strict Baptist Chapel at Lower Dicker, built in 1837, is the most prominent example; it was founded by members of nearby Golden Cross Chapel (1813), who had met locally for small-scale meetings of a Calvinist character since the late 18th century.  Both chapels are still in use.  Thomas Dicker, a member of a long-established local family, founded Five Ash Down Independent Chapel in 1784; his son was involved with the Strict Baptist churches at Uckfield and Hailsham.  A member of Zoar left to take up the pastorate at Ebenezer Chapel at Bodle Street Green and changing its doctrines to Strict Baptist.  Many Strict Baptist chapels in the district have closed, but others still in use—often for congregations established long before they were built—include the chapels at Blackboys (1875), Broad Oak (1859), Jarvis Brook (1876), Mayfield (1873), Pick Hill (1873) and Rotherfield (1858).

Religious affiliation
According to the United Kingdom Census 2011, 148,915 people lived in Wealden.  Of these, 64.01% identified themselves as Christian, 0.38% were Muslim, 0.16% were Jewish, 0.3% were Buddhist, 0.15% were Hindu, 0.02% were Sikh, 0.76% followed another religion, 26.29% claimed no religious affiliation and 7.94% did not state their religion.  The proportion of Christians was higher than the 59.38% in England as a whole, and the proportions of people claiming adherence to another religion or no religious affiliation were also higher in Rother than nationally (the figures for England as a whole were 0.43% and 24.74% respectively).  The percentage of people in Rother not answering this census question was also higher than the 7.18% nationally.  Other religions named in the census had much lower proportions of followers than in England overall—the corresponding national percentages were 5.02% for Islam, 1.52% for Hinduism, 0.79% for Sikhism, 0.49% for Judaism and 0.45% for Buddhists.

Administration
All Anglican churches in Wealden are part of the Diocese of Chichester, whose cathedral is at Chichester in West Sussex, and most are in the Archdeaconry of Lewes and Hastings—one of three subdivisions which make up the next highest level of administration.  In turn, this archdeaconry is divided into eight deaneries.  The churches at Hooe and Ninfield are in the Rural Deanery of Battle and Bexhill.  Those at Bodle Street Green, Broad Oak, Cross-in-Hand, Hailsham, Hawkswood, Heathfield, Hellingly, Herstmonceux, Horam, Old Heathfield, Upper Dicker, Waldron, Warbleton and Wartling are part of the Rural Deanery of Dallington. East Dean, Friston, Jevington, Pevensey, Pevensey Bay, Polegate, Stone Cross, Westham and Willingdon's churches are in the Eastbourne Rural Deanery.  The churches at Alciston, Alfriston, Arlington, Berwick, Chalvington, Folkington, Laughton, Litlington, Lullington, Ripe, Selmeston, West Dean and Wilmington are in the Rural Deanery of Lewes and Seaford.  Those at Blackham, Coleman's Hatch, Crowborough (three churches), Eridge Green, Five Ashes, Frant, Groombridge, Hartfield, Jarvis Brook, Mark Cross, Mayfield, Rotherfield, Tidebrook, Wadhurst and Withyham are in Rotherfield Rural Deanery.  Buxted's two churches and those at Chelwood Gate, Chiddingly, Danehill, East Hoathly, Fairwarp, Fletching, Framfield, Hadlow Down, High Hurstwood, Isfield, Little Horsted, Maresfield, Nutley and Uckfield are part of the Rural Deanery of Uckfield.  Three churches in the north of the district—at Forest Row, Hammerwood and Holtye Common (now redundant)—are part of the Rural Deanery of East Grinstead in the Archdeaconry of Horsham.

The Roman Catholic Diocese of Arundel and Brighton, whose cathedral is at Arundel, administers Wealden's eight Roman Catholic churches.  The churches at Hailsham and Polegate are in Eastbourne and St Leonards-on-Sea Deanery; and the other seven—at Crowborough, Heathfield, Heron's Ghyll, Mayfield, Rotherfield, Uckfield and Wadhurst—are in Mayfield Deanery.  The churches at Hailsham and Polegate are part of a joint parish, as are Uckfield's and Heron's Ghyll's churches.  Until its closure in 2019, the Catholic church at Rotherfield was part of a joint parish with Wadhurst in Rother District, also part of Mayfield Deanery.

The Central Sussex United Area, an ecumenical partnership between the Methodist Church and the United Reformed Church's Southern Synod, was formed in September 2007 to administer churches belonging to those denominations in an area bounded by Haywards Heath, Eastbourne and Crowoborough.  The churches covered by this partnership are the Methodist churches at Buxted, Cross-in-Hand, Gamelands and Hailsham, the United Reformed Church at Polegate and the joint Methodist and United Reformed churches at Crowborough, Lower Willingdon and Uckfield.  Ninfield Methodist Church is part of the 13-church Hastings, Bexhill and Rye Methodist Circuit.

Union Church in Heathfield and the Herstmonceux Free Church are part of the Congregational Federation, an association of independent Congregational churches in Great Britain.  The federation came into existence in 1972 when the Congregational Church in England and Wales merged with several other denominations to form the United Reformed Church.  Certain congregations wanted to remain independent of this, and instead joined the Congregational Federation.  As of January 2021 there were 235 churches in the Federation.

Union Church and Welcome Baptist Church at Heathfield, Trinity Church at Lower Willingdon and the Baptist churches in Pevensey Bay and Uckfield are administratively part of the East Sussex Network of the South Eastern Baptist Association.  Forest Row Baptist Church is covered by the Association's Gatwick Network.  The district also has several Strict Baptist chapels which are part of the Gospel Standard movement: the chapels called Ebenezer at Bodle Street Green, Broad Oak and Horam (Pick Hill), Hope Chapel at Blackboys, Providence at Rotherfield, Rehoboth at Jarvis Brook, Zoar at Lower Dicker and the chapels at Mayfield and Foresters Hall in Uckfield.

Bells Yew Green Chapel and Hailsham Gospel Mission belong to the Countess of Huntingdon's Connexion—a small group of Evangelical churches founded by Selina Hastings, Countess of Huntingdon during the 18th-century Evangelical Revival—which has 22 churches in England, concentrated particularly in Sussex.

Current places of worship

See also

List of demolished places of worship in East Sussex
List of former places of worship in Wealden

Notes

References

Bibliography

 (Available online in 14 parts; Guide to abbreviations on page 6)

Wealden
Wealden
Wealden
Wealden District